L.J. Institute of Pharmacy, commonly referred as LJIP, is a private management institute located in Ahmedabad, Gujarat, India. The institute is approved by All India Council for Technical Education (AICTE) and Pharmacy Council of India (PCI) and is the part of L.J. Group of Institutes managed by Lok Jagruti Kendra (LJK) Trust. The institute is affiliated to Gujarat Technological University (GTU). The institute is approved by Department of Scientific and Industrial Research (DSIR), Ministry of Science and Technology, Govt. of India as Scientific and Industrial Research Organization (SIRO).

Academic programmes

The Institute runs B.Pharm., M.Pharm. (in Pharmaceutical Technology, Quality Assurance, Regulatory affairs and Pharmacology) and Ph.D. courses.

Facilities

Laboratories
Institute laboratories are equipped with HPLC, FTIR, Lyophilizer, UV Spectrophotometer, Rotary Compression Machine, All purpose equipment, Extruder, Spheronizer, Coating machine, Ampoule Filling and Sealing Machine, Dissolution Apparatus, Rapid Mixture Granulator (RMG), Colloid & Multi Mill, Fluidized Bed Dryer (FBD),Franz diffusion cell apparatus, Single and double channel Physiograph, Semi-Auto analyzer, Biological Oxygen Demand Incubator (BOD), Flame Photometer, fuming hood, Rotary film evaporator etc.

Library
The library has more than 10000 technical and non-technical books including E-books, National and International Journals, reference books, handbooks, Pharmacopoeias and encyclopedias. It has multimedia computers with internet connectivity for staff and students.

L J Industry Interaction and Placement Cell (LJIIPC)
The institute maintains a training and placement cell to help students prepare for job searches. Assistance is given to students in developing interviewing skills.

Student services
Cafeteria:
The canteen and other food store is available in the campus, where they can get lunch, breakfast and refreshment. This facility is available for the students and staff at competitive rates.

Transportation service:
Buses are available for to and fro transportation.

Student activities

LJ Innovation Village (technical exhibition)
It provides a platform to the innovative ideas of students to convert them into products.
Till date about 1200 projects have been already showcased by students of pharmacy, engineering, polytechnic and MCA.

PIILLS Program (Pharmacy Industry Institute Linked Lecture Series)
Guest lectures are conducted by the resource persons with industrial experience at the institute to fill up the gap between institute curriculum and actual practice conducted in industries.

GPAT Counseling and online pre-GPAT exam

The institute provides GPAT counselling to the students and has created facility for online pre-GPAT counselling with dedicated server and software

SMP (Standard Mentorship Program)
Each faculty mentors group of 20-25 students with respect to their academic performance, attendance and their overall growth during the 4 years of the course. Faculties give more interest in academically weak students and also conduct home visits for the improvement of the particular student.

Course for English proficiency
LJ Institutes provides Cambridge University, UK certified course for English proficiency required in corporate world of pharmaceutical industry.

PharmaCRADLE
Pharma Capability Recognition And Development Lessons for Entrepreneurship (PharmaCRADLE) provides for an interactive sessions with first generation Pharmaceutical entrepreneurs, workshops for development of entrepreneurship skills, bridge workshops, and MDP workshops, and research projects with SMEs.

PharmaVenture
It is a Pharma model making competition where students innovate and manufacture prototype models of industrial equipments. The institute has already filled few patents out of such models.

Antrapreneur-The business incubator
The business incubator for entrepreneurship development and support by means of incubation, investment and training by bringing together students and faculty and alumni of the L. J. Group of Institutes, budding entrepreneurs, industrialists and mentors from across sectors.

SPANDAN
SPANDAN- The Vibrations Reloaded is an annual cultural programme where students showcase their talents on the stage.

Job fair
The institute has been organizing Job fairs with the help of LJIIPC, supported by GTU for students of the institute and other Pharmacy colleges in Gujarat where companies come to the campus for the placement.

Alumni association
It is established in 2011. Many alumni members are at positions like director, CEO, R&D head, marketing head, and entrepreneurs with companies of India.

References

External links
 L.J. Group of Institute's Official website
 L.J. Knowledge Foundation
 Gujarat Technological University
 All India Council For Technical Education
 Pharmacy Council of India
[LJ University]

All India Council for Technical Education
Pharmacy schools in India
Universities and colleges in Ahmedabad